Mozhayskoye is a rural locality (a settlement) in Spasskoye Rural Settlement, Vologodsky District, Vologda Oblast, Russia. The population was 763 as of 2002. There are 19 streets.

Geography 
Mozhayskoye is located 13 km southwest of Vologda (the district's administrative centre) by road. Kotelnikovo is the nearest rural locality.

References 

Rural localities in Vologodsky District